Hil'ardin, also known as the Sharp-Hardin-Wright House, at 212 S. Lee St. in Forsyth, Georgia, was built in 1836.  The house, with two other contributing buildings, was listed on the National Register of Historic Places in 1979.

The visible Classical Revival-style house was created in 1916, enclosing a c.1836 predecessor.

References

Houses on the National Register of Historic Places in Georgia (U.S. state)
Neoclassical architecture in Georgia (U.S. state)
Houses completed in 1916
Monroe County, Georgia